Elizabeth Ann Gilmour (née Smart; born November 3, 1987) is an American child safety activist and commentator for ABC News. She gained national attention at age 14 when she was abducted from her home in Salt Lake City by Brian David Mitchell. Mitchell and his wife, Wanda Barzee, held Smart captive for nine months until she was rescued by police officers on a street in Sandy, Utah.

Smart has since gone on to work as an activist and advocate for missing persons. Her life and abduction have been the subject of numerous non-fiction books and films.

Early life
Elizabeth Ann Smart was born on November 3, 1987, in Salt Lake City, Utah, to Edward "Ed" and Lois Smart. Her family was part of the Church of Jesus Christ of Latter-day Saints.  She is the second-oldest child in her family; she has four brothers and one sister. Smart attended Bryant Middle School and East High School in Salt Lake City. She later enrolled in Brigham Young University, where she earned her Bachelor of Music in harp performance.

Kidnapping 

On June 5, 2002, 14-year-old Smart was abducted at knifepoint from her bedroom in her family's house in Salt Lake City, Utah. For the next nine months, she was raped daily, tied up, and threatened with death if she attempted to escape. She was rescued by police officers on March 12, 2003, on a public street in Sandy, Utah,  from her home. Two witnesses recognized abductors Brian David Mitchell and Wanda Ileen Barzee from an America's Most Wanted episode.

On November 16, 2009, Barzee pled guilty to assisting in the kidnapping of Elizabeth Smart as part of a plea bargain with prosecutors. On May 19, 2010, federal Judge Dale A. Kimball sentenced Barzee to 15 years in federal prison. As part of a plea deal between the defense and federal prosecutors, he gave Barzee credit for seven years that she had already served. The court found Mitchell competent to stand trial for kidnapping and sexual assault charges. He was found guilty on both counts and sentenced in May 2011 to two life terms in federal prison.

Activism and media coverage 

On March 8, 2006, Smart went before the United States Congress to support sexual predator legislation and the AMBER Alert system. On July 26, 2006, she spoke after the signing of the Adam Walsh Act. In May 2008, she traveled to Washington, D.C., where she helped present a book, You're Not Alone, published by the U.S. Department of Justice. It contained entries from her as well as four other recovered young adults. In 2009, Smart commented on the kidnapping of Jaycee Lee Dugard, stressing that dwelling upon the past is unproductive.

On October 27, 2009, Smart spoke at the 2009 Women's Conference in California, hosted by Maria Shriver, on overcoming obstacles in life. In 2011, Smart founded the Elizabeth Smart Foundation, which aims to bring hope and end the victimization and exploitation of sexual assault through prevention, recovery, and advocacy. In March 2011, Smart was one of four women awarded the Diane von Furstenberg Award. On July 7, 2011, ABC News announced that she would work as a commentator for them, mainly focusing on missing persons.

In July 2012, Theta Phi Alpha National Fraternity honored Smart with the Siena Medal award. The medal is the highest honor the organization bestows upon a non-member. They named it after their patroness, St. Catherine of Siena. On May 1, 2013, in a speech at a human trafficking conference at Johns Hopkins University, Smart discussed the need to emphasize individual self-worth in fighting human trafficking and the importance of dispelling cultural myths surrounding girls' loss of value upon sexual contact. Having been raped by her captor, she recalled the destructive impact of exposure to abstinence-only sexual education programs. Many of them teach that a sexually active girl is akin to a chewed piece of gum. "I thought, 'Oh, my gosh, I'm that chewed up piece of gum, nobody re-chews a piece of gum, you throw it away.' And that's how easy it is to feel like you no longer have worth, you no longer have value," Smart said. "Why would it even be worth screaming out? Why would it even make a difference if you are rescued? Your life still has no value." Smart went on to ask that listeners educate children on having self-worth, avoiding viewing themselves as victims.

In February 2014, Smart testified before the Utah State House of Representatives in favor of HB 286. The bill would create an optional curriculum for use in Utah schools to provide training on child sexual abuse prevention. In early 2015, Faith Counts featured Smart in a video in which she explains how her religion sustained her through her ordeal and helped her heal. As of September 2016, Smart is a correspondent for the true-crime show Crime Watch Daily. Various state politicians have proposed bills that would require all computers to have a pornography filter, branding it the "Elizabeth Smart Law." However, in March 2018, her spokesman denied her relationship to the proposal. Her lawyer sent a cease and desist letter to the politicians in which they were ordered not to use her name.

On June 5, 2017, on the 15th anniversary of her abduction, Lifetime aired the made-for-TV film titled I Am Elizabeth Smart, narrated and produced by Smart, which tells the story of her kidnapping from her perspective. The film starred Alana Boden as Elizabeth Smart, Skeet Ulrich as Brian David Mitchell, Deirdre Lovejoy as Wanda Ileen Barzee, George Newbern as Ed Smart, and Anne Openshaw as Lois Smart. In 2018, Smart published Where There's Hope: Healing, Moving Forward, and Never Giving Up with St. Martin's Press.

Her abduction and rescue were widely reported and were the subject of a made-for-TV movie, The Elizabeth Smart Story, Lifetime's I Am Elizabeth Smart and non-fiction books. In October 2013, My Story, a memoir of Smart's experience co-written with Chris Stewart, was published by St. Martin's Press. The book details both Smart's kidnapping and the formation of the Elizabeth Smart Foundation, which works to promote awareness about abductions. Smart has played the harp on national television in the United States.

Smart's uncle, Tom Smart, and author Lee Benson wrote a book about the search for Smart, In Plain Sight: The Startling Truth Behind the Elizabeth Smart Investigation. Her father wrote another book about Smart's kidnapping, called Bringing Elizabeth Home. A television movie, The Elizabeth Smart Story, was made in 2003, based on the book by Smart's father.

In 2021, Smart competed on The Masked Dancer as "Moth". She was eliminated during the third episode of the series, placing eighth overall in the competition.

In 2022, Elizabeth Smart was the executive producer of the Lifetime movie Stolen by Their Father as part of its "Ripped from the Headlines" feature film which talked about Lizbeth Meredith's plans to reclaim her daughters after being kept in Greece by Meredith's ex-husband Greg during their visit to him.

In 2023, Smart was the executive producer of the Lifetime movie The Girl Who Escaped: The Kara Robinson Story which detailed the abduction of Kara Robinson at the hands of Richard Evonitz.

Personal life
On November 11, 2009, Smart left Salt Lake City to serve as a missionary for the Church of Jesus Christ of Latter-day Saints in Paris. Smart temporarily returned from her mission in November 2010 to serve as the chief witness in the federal trial of Brian David Mitchell. After the trial, she returned to France to finish her mission, coming home to Utah in early 2011.

While serving as missionaries in the Paris Mission, Smart met Scotland native Matthew Gilmour. In January 2012, after a courtship of one year, they became engaged. They married on February 18, 2012, in a private ceremony in the Laie Hawaii Temple. Since then, the couple has had three children in 2015, 2017, and 2018.

In 2019, while traveling home to Utah aboard a Delta Airlines flight, Smart alleged that she was awakened by a male passenger next to her rubbing her inner thigh. She reported the incident and began a self-defense program for women and girls called Smart Defense.

See also
 Alicia Kozakiewicz

References

Citations

Sources

External links

 
 Elizabeth Smart inspirational documentary: "Your Past Does Not Dictate Your Future"
 Elizabeth Smart Missing Child Profile at America's Most Wanted
 Elizabeth Smart's TEDx Talk

1987 births
Living people
21st-century Mormon missionaries
ABC News personalities
Activists from Utah
American classical harpists
American founders
American Latter Day Saint writers
American Mormon missionaries in France
American nonprofit executives
American women memoirists
Anti–human trafficking activists
Brigham Young University alumni
Child crime victim advocates
Female Mormon missionaries
Kidnapped American children
Latter Day Saints from Utah
Mormon memoirists
Musicians from Salt Lake City
Sexual abuse victim advocates
Women founders
Women harpists
Writers from Salt Lake City